PetitionOnline was an Internet petition service founded and trademarked in 1999 by Artifice, Inc., and now operated by Change.org, that allows users to create and sign petitions. When enough signatures on a petition are collected, the creator of the petition can send it towards its intended target, usually by e-mail. According to the site itself, as of April 22, 2008, it had collected more than 66 million signatures and "thousands and thousands" of active petitions. A large number of hosted petitions are political in nature, but petitions come in eight categories: Politics and Government (including categories for USA, state, local, and international), Entertainment and Media, Environment, Religion, and Technology & Business. On September 30, 2014, PetitionOnline shut down.

In the news
Some of the site's petitions received outside attention for the issues they have stood for. The site claimed that its first official response to a hosted petition was from the "Dissatisfied Web TV Consumer Petition", in which Dennis Reno, senior director of Web TV customer service, responded to the claims of low-quality service. In January 2002, CNN wrote a formal apology to the National Association of Muslim Women, which posted the "Petition to Correct the Negative Portrayal of Muslim Women in CNN Program Coverage" on the PetitionOnline site in December 2001, over perceived offensive comments made by Leon Harris during the TalkBack Live program.  Later that year, the New York Post promoted a PetitionOnline-hosted petition asking the ABC television network to keep country singer Toby Keith in its 2002 Independence Day special over the controversy regarding Keith's song "The Angry American".

In 2004, the petition "iBook Logic Board Failure" was part of the coverage over a threatened lawsuit against Apple Computer over defective iBook laptops. In 2005, the petition "Support for Nathan Warmack's Right to Wear his Kilt" received attention for the issue of the mentioned high school student's right to wear a kilt to a school dance in Jackson High School in Jackson, Missouri. In 2007, the petition "Filipino Americans demand for apology from ABC and Desperate Housewives" received media attention after the American television series Desperate Housewives included a line said to be bigoted against Filipinos.

Other claims of success through hosted online petitions include the introduction of Sci-Fi Channel Australia and the stopping of the possible closure of the San Francisco Japantown.

Criticism
Some of the petitions hosted on the site have cause the credibility of the site to be questioned. One petition, titled "Let's Save America - Ban Anime Now!" is an example of a hoax petition that was easily created on PetitionOnline, intended to demonstrate the unmonitored oversight of petitions on the site.

See also
Internet petition

References

American websites
Online petitions
Internet-based activism